These are the squads for the 2002 CONCACAF Gold Cup.

Group A

El Salvador
Head coach:  Carlos Recinos

Guatemala
Head coach:  Julio César Cortés

Mexico
Head coach:  Javier Aguirre

Group B

Cuba
Head coach:  Miguel Company

South Korea
Head coach:  Guus Hiddink

United States
Head coach:  Bruce Arena

 Lagos and Cunningham were replaced after group matches by

Group C

Costa Rica
Head coach:  Alexandre Guimarães

Martinique
Head coach:  Théodore Antonin

Trinidad and Tobago
Head coach:  Renê Simões

Group D

Canada
Head coach:  Holger Osieck

Ecuador
Head coach:  Hernán Darío Gómez

Haiti
Head coach:  Jorge Castelli

External links
Gold Cup 2002 at RSSSF

CONCACAF Gold Cup squads
2002 CONCACAF Gold Cup